Jean Verschneider (29 August 1872 – 20 December 1943) was a French sculptor. His work was part of the sculpture event in the art competition at the 1924 Summer Olympics.

References

1872 births
1943 deaths
19th-century French sculptors
20th-century French sculptors
French male sculptors
Olympic competitors in art competitions
Place of birth missing
19th-century French male artists